West Bromwich by-election may refer to one of three parliamentary by-elections held for the British House of Commons constituency of West Bromwich:

1941 West Bromwich by-election
1963 West Bromwich by-election
1973 West Bromwich by-election

See also
West Bromwich (UK Parliament constituency)